Gedaliah, Gedalia, Gedallah  or Gedalya(h) ( or ;  Gəḏalyyā or  Gəḏalyyāhū, meaning "Jah has become Great") was, according to the narratives in the Hebrew Bible's Book of Jeremiah and Second Book of Kings, appointed by Nebuchadnezzar II of Babylon as governor of Yehud province, which was formed after the defeat of the Kingdom of Judah and the destruction of Jerusalem, in a part of the territory that previously formed the kingdom. He was supported by a Chaldean guard stationed at Mizpah. On hearing of the appointment, the Jews that had taken refuge in surrounding countries returned to Judah.

Gedaliah was the son of Ahikam (who saved the life of the prophet Jeremiah) and the grandson of Shaphan (who is mentioned in relation to the discovery of the scroll of Teaching that some scholars identify as the core of the book of Deuteronomy).

He zealously began to encourage the people to cultivate the fields and vineyards, and thus lay the foundation of security. Many who had fled to neighboring lands during the war of destruction were attracted by the news of the revival of the community. They came to Gedaliah in Mizpah and were warmly welcomed by him.

Ishmael son of Nethaniah, and the ten men who were with him, murdered Gedaliah, together with most of the Jews who had joined him and many Babylonians whom Nebuchadnezzar had left with Gedaliah. The remaining Judeans feared the vengeance of Nebuchadnezzar and fled to Egypt. Although the dates are not clear from the Bible, this probably happened about 582/1 BCE, some four to five years and three months after the destruction of Jerusalem and the First Temple in 586 BCE.

Fast of Gedaliah

To lament the assassination of Gedaliah, which left Judah devoid of any Jews and Jewish rule and completed the destruction of the First Temple, the Jewish Sages established the third day of Tishrei as the Fast of Gedaliah. Although Gedaliah's assassination perhaps occurred on the first day of Tishrei, the fast is observed on the third day so as not to coincide with Rosh Hashanah.

References

580s BC deaths
Assassinated Jews
Assassinated politicians
6th-century BCE Jews
Ten Days of Repentance
Book of Jeremiah
Books of Kings people
Biblical murder victims